Half-cocked may refer to:

 half-cock, the position the hammer of a firearm that is partially cocked
 Halfcocked, a hard rock band
 Half-Cocked (film), a 1994 film